The Schiphol–Antwerp high-speed railway is a high-speed rail line connecting Schiphol Airport railway station, 9 kilometres southwest of the centre of Amsterdam, Netherlands, to Antwerp, Belgium. It has a total length of 147 kilometres (91 miles).

It comprises the following parts:

 HSL-Zuid, the northern part, in the Netherlands
 HSL 4, the southern part, in Belgium

International railway lines in Europe